William Joseph Moran (January 15, 1906 – August 23, 1996) was a Roman Catholic bishop who served the Archdiocese for the Military Services.

Biography
Born in San Francisco, California, Moran was ordained to the priesthood on June 20, 1931, for the Roman Catholic Archdiocese of San Francisco, California.

On September 15, 1965, Moran was appointed titular bishop of Centuria and auxiliary bishop of the Roman Catholic Archdiocese for the Military Services, USA and was consecrated on December 13, 1965. Moran retired on January 15, 1981.

See also

 Catholic Church hierarchy
 Catholic Church in the United States
 Historical list of the Catholic bishops of the United States
 Insignia of Chaplain Schools in the US Military
 List of Catholic bishops of the United States
 List of Catholic bishops of the United States: military service
 Lists of patriarchs, archbishops, and bishops
 Military chaplain
 Religious symbolism in the United States military
 United States military chaplains

References

External links
 Archdiocese for the Military Services, USA, official website
 Archdiocese for the Military Services of the United States. GCatholic.org. Retrieved 2010-08-20.

1906 births
1996 deaths
People from San Francisco
20th-century American Roman Catholic titular bishops
Roman Catholic Archdiocese of San Francisco
American military chaplains
Chaplains
Catholics from California